Anommonia is a genus of flies belonging to the family Lesser Dung flies.

Species
A. alopecialis (Richards, 1968)
A. appendicigera Schmitz, 1917
A. flavicaput (Richards, 1968)
A. nudipes Richards, 1950
A. patrizii (Richards, 1950)
A. schwabi Schmitz, 1917
A. spinipleura (Richards, 1968)

References

Sphaeroceridae
Diptera of Asia
Diptera of Africa
Brachycera genera